The Exploded View is a quartet of stories by Ivan Vladislavic published in 2004. The stories revolve around four very different gauteng residents in Johannesburg: a statistician employed on the national census, an engineer out on the town with his council connections, an artist with an interest in genocide, and a contractor who erects billboards on building sites; each tries to make sense of a changed world after the demise of apartheid.

External links
The Mail and Guardian Review
The Cape Times review (pdf file)

2004 short story collections
South African short story collections
Random House books